Excremis is a genus of herbs in the family Asphodelaceae, first described as a genus in 1829. There are only one known species, Excremis coarctata, native to South America (Venezuela, Colombia, Ecuador, Peru, Bolivia, and northwestern Brazil).

References 

Monotypic Asphodelaceae genera
Hemerocallidoideae